Díonísio de Oliveira Alves  (born 18 January 1988), simply known as Díonísio, is a Brazilian retired footballer who played as a defensive midfielder.

Honours
Santos
Campeonato Paulista: 2007

External links
 santos.globo.com
 CBF

1988 births
Living people
Footballers from São Paulo (state)
Brazilian footballers
Association football midfielders
Campeonato Brasileiro Série A players
Campeonato Brasileiro Série B players
Campeonato Brasileiro Série C players
Campeonato Brasileiro Série D players
Santos FC players
Oeste Futebol Clube players
Esporte Clube Santo André players
Associação Atlética Ponte Preta players
Paraná Clube players
Grêmio Barueri Futebol players
Barretos Esporte Clube players